Lou Campi (1905-1989) was a professional bowler.  He was known as Wrong Foot Louie, a reference to the fact that, unusually for a right-handed bowler, he completed his delivery on his right foot.  Campi was born in Verona, Italy.

In the 1940s, he was a successful television bowler.

He won the first ever event on the PBA Tour: the 1959 Empire State PBA Open.  At age 54, he is still the third oldest player to win a PBA Tour title. 

Campi was also a multiple-time national doubles champion.

References

American ten-pin bowling players
1905 births
1989 deaths